Aleksotas Hill is a hill in Kaunas near Nemunas River. There is an observation deck to the Kaunas Old Town which was renovated in 2020 and Aleksotas Funicular.

References

External links

Hills of Lithuania
Tourist attractions in Kaunas